Scotorythra hyparcha is a moth of the family Geometridae. It was first described by Edward Meyrick in 1899. It is endemic to the island of Hawaii.

The larvae probably feed on Metrosideros species.

External links

H
Endemic moths of Hawaii